The following is a list of South Korean films released in 2022.

Box office
The highest-grossing South Korean films released in 2022, by domestic box office gross revenue, are as follows:

Released

January – March

April – June

July – September

October–December

See also
 List of 2022 box office number-one films in South Korea
 2022 in South Korea
 Impact of the COVID-19 pandemic on cinema

References

External links

 

South Korean
2022
2022 in South Korean cinema